Microvoluta cryptomitra is a species of sea snail, a marine gastropod mollusk in the family Volutomitridae.

Description
The length of the shell attains 9.4 mm.

Distribution
This marine species occurs in the Coral Sea.

References

 Bouchet P. & Kantor Y. 2004. New Caledonia: the major centre of biodiversity for volutomitrid molluscs (Mollusca: Neogastropoda: Volutomitridae). Systematics and Biodiversity 1(4): 467–502
 Y. Kantor, 2010, Checklist of Recent Volutomitridae

Volutomitridae
Gastropods described in 2004